Jennings is a city in Decatur County, Kansas, United States.  As of the 2020 census, the population of the city was 81.

History
The first post office at Jennings was established in 1874, but the post office there was called Slab City until 1879.

Jennings was laid out in 1888. It was named for Warren Jennings, a landowner.

Jennings was located on the Chicago, Rock Island and Pacific Railroad.

Jennings was a popular area for Czech immigrants to settle and start their farms.

Geography
Jennings is located at  (39.680197, -100.293918).

Demographics

2010 census
As of the census of 2010, there were 96 people, 50 households, and 30 families living in the city. The racial makeup of the city was 99.0% White and 1.0% from two or more races.

There were 50 households, of which 10.0% had children under the age of 18 living with them, 48.0% were married couples living together, 6.0% had a female householder with no husband present, 6.0% had a male householder with no wife present, and 40.0% were non-families. 34.0% of all households were made up of individuals, and 18% had someone living alone who was 65 years of age or older. The average household size was 1.92 and the average family size was 2.37.

The median age in the city was 61.7 years. 8.3% of residents were under the age of 18; 5.2% were between the ages of 18 and 24; 14.6% were from 25 to 44; 26.1% were from 45 to 64; and 45.8% were 65 years of age or older. The gender makeup of the city was 50.0% male and 50.0% female.

2000 census
As of the census of 2000, there were 146 people, 73 households, and 41 families living in the city. The racial makeup of the city was 100.00% White. Hispanic or Latino of any race were 0.68% of the population.

There were 73 households, out of which 13.7% had children under the age of 18 living with them, 50.7% were married couples living together, and 43.8% were non-families. 37.0% of all households were made up of individuals, and 21.9% had someone living alone who was 65 years of age or older. The average household size was 2.00 and the average family size was 2.54.

In the city, the population was spread out, with 15.1% under the age of 18, 8.2% from 18 to 24, 25.3% from 25 to 44, 19.9% from 45 to 64, and 31.5% who were 65 years of age or older. The median age was 46 years. For every 100 females, there were 117.9 males. For every 100 females age 18 and over, there were 106.7 males.

The median income for a household in the city was $21,146, and the median income for a family was $42,917. Males had a median income of $29,107 versus $21,667 for females. The per capita income for the city was $16,294. There were none of the families and 12.0% of the population living below the poverty line, including no under eighteens and 9.5% of those over 64.

Education
South of Highway 383 is served by Hoxie USD 412 public school district, north of the highway is served by Oberlin USD 294.

Jennings schools were closed in school unification. The Jennings High School mascot was the Coyotes.

References

Further reading

External links
 Jennings - Directory of Public Officials
 Jennings city map, KDOT

Cities in Kansas
Cities in Decatur County, Kansas